Kavankarai is a neighbourhood near Pulhal in Chennai district of Tamil Nadu state in the peninsular India. Red Hills, Pulhal, Vinayagapuram, Kallikuppam, Padianallur, Cholavaram, Karanodai, Madhavaram, Lakshmipuram and Kolathur are some of the important neighbourhoods of Kavankarai. Kannappa Swamigal was a spiritualist who lived in Kavankarai.

References

External links 
 Geohack

Neighbourhoods in Chennai